Sora is a town and municipality in the Central Boyacá Province, part of the Colombian Department of Boyacá. Sora borders Motavita and Chíquiza in the north, Cucaita and Samacá in the south, Motavita and department capital Tunja in the east and Sáchica and Chíquiza in the west.

Etymology 
The name Sora comes from Chibcha and means "Devil worshipper".

History 
In the times before the Spanish conquest, the area of Sora was inhabited by the Muisca, organised in their loose Muisca Confederation. Sora was under the rule of the zaque from nearby Hunza.

Modern Sora was founded on August 12, 1556 by Tomás Gualba Castellanos.

Born in Sora 
 Mauricio Neiza, professional cyclist

Gallery

References 

Municipalities of Boyacá Department
Populated places established in 1556
1556 establishments in the Spanish Empire
Muisca Confederation
Muysccubun